William Alfred Peffer (September 10, 1831October 6, 1912) was a United States Senator from Kansas, notable for being the first of six Populists (two of whom, more than any other state, were from Kansas) elected to the United States Senate. In the Senate he was recognizable by his enormous flowing beard. His name was also raised as a possible third-party presidential candidate in 1896.

Biography

Born in Cumberland County, Pennsylvania, Peffer attended the public schools and commenced teaching at the age of 15. He followed the gold rush to San Francisco, California in 1850 and moved to Indiana in 1853, Missouri in 1859, and Illinois in 1862. During the Civil War he enlisted in the Union Army as a private, was promoted to second lieutenant, and served as regimental quartermaster and adjutant, post adjutant, judge advocate of the military commission, and department Army he studied law, and was admitted to the bar in 1865, commencing practice in Clarksville, Tennessee. He moved to Fredonia, Kansas in 1870 and continued the practice of law, and purchased and edited the Fredonia Journal.

Peffer was a member of the Kansas Senate from 1874 to 1876 and moved to Coffeyville, Kansas, where he edited the Coffeyville Journal in 1875 and also practiced law. He was a presidential elector on Republican candidate James A. Garfield's ticket in 1880 and was editor of the Topeka-based Kansas Farmer in 1881. He was elected as a Populist to the U.S. Senate by the Kansas Legislature and served from March 4, 1891, to March 3, 1897. He was an unsuccessful candidate for reelection in 1896, being beaten by a fellow Populist William A. Harris, making Peffer the only Populist senator to be succeeded by a fellow Populist. While in the Senate, he was chairman of the Committee to Examine Branches of the Civil Service (Fifty-third and Fifty-fourth Congresses). He was, in 1898, an unsuccessful candidate for Governor of Kansas, and afterward engaged in literary pursuits. Peffer died in Grenola, Kansas in 1912 and was interred in Topeka Cemetery under a soldier's government-issued tombstone.

Footnotes
 Retrieved on 2009-05-05

Works

 Populism: Its Rise and Fall. [1899] Peter H. Argersinger (ed.). Lawrence, KS: University Press of Kansas, 1992.

Further reading

 Peter H. Argersinger, Populism and Politics: William A. Peffer and the People’s Party. Lexington: University Press of Kentucky, 1974.
 Norman K. Risjord, Representative Americans: Populists and Progressives. Lanham, MD: Rowman & Littlefield Publishers, 2004.

External links

 

1831 births
1912 deaths
People from Cumberland County, Pennsylvania
People's Party United States senators from Kansas
Republican Party Kansas state senators
American newspaper editors
Journalists from Pennsylvania
People from Coffeyville, Kansas
People from Fredonia, Kansas
19th-century American politicians
Union Army officers
Military personnel from Illinois
People buried in Topeka Cemetery